Werner Hermann Quast (21 June 1920 – 12 July 1962) was a German Luftwaffe ace and recipient of the Knight's Cross of the Iron Cross during World War II.  The Knight's Cross of the Iron Cross was awarded to recognise extreme battlefield bravery or successful military leadership. Following a mid-air collision on 7 August 1943, he was taken prisoner by Soviet forces and was held until 1949. He joined the postwar Luftwaffe in 1956 and died in a helicopter accident in Mittenwald on 12 July 1962. During his career he was credited with 84 aerial victories, all on the Eastern Front.

Career
Quast was born on 21 June 1920 in Thale of the Weimar Republic. Following flight training, he was posted to the 4. Staffel (5th squadron) of Jagdgeschwader 52 (JG 52—52nd Fighter Wing) in the summer of 1942. At the time, the Staffel was under the command of Oberleutnant Gerhard Barkhorn and subordinated to II. Gruppe (2nd group) of JG 52 headed by Hauptmann Johannes Steinhoff.

War against the Soviet Union
In August 1942, II. Gruppe was subordinated to VIII. Fliegerkorps and supported the 6th Army offensive to capture Stalingrad. On 20 August, II. Flying from this airfield, Quast claimed his first aerial victory on 23 August when he shot down a Lavochkin-Gorbunov-Gudkov LaGG-3 fighter. Six days later, Quast claimed two further LaGG fighters in the same combat area.

In September 1942, II. Gruppe was ordered into the Battle of the Caucasus, supporting Army Group South on the front over the Caucasus. Opposing it was the 4th and 5th Air Armies of the Red Air Force. The Gruppe then moved to Maykop located in the North Caucasus on 21 September where, with the exception of 24 to 29 October, they were based until 26 November. Operating from Maykop, Quast claimed his fourth and fifth aerial victory when he again claimed two LaGG fighters shot down on 7 October. To support the German forces fighting in the Battle of Stalingrad forced the Luftwaffe to relocate its forces and ordered II.

Kuban bridgehead and Crimea

The Gruppe was moved to the combat area of the Kuban bridgehead on 10 February 1943 where it was initially based at an airfield at Slavyansk-na-Kubani. Due to whether conditions, II. Gruppe then moved to Kerch on 16 February. While based at Slavyansk-na-Kubani, Quast claimed three aerial victories on 11 February including two Polikarpov I-16 fighters. The next day, he shot down an Ilyushin Il-2 ground-attack aircraft followed by four fighters claimed destroyed on 13 February. Operating from Kerch, Quast claimed a I-16 fighter shot down on 25 February and a LaGG-3 fighter the next day followed by a Petlyakov Pe-2 bomber on 5 March. On 13 March, the Gruppe moved to Anapa located on the northern coast of the Black Sea near the Sea of Azov and was fighting in the Battle of the Caucasus.

Flying from Anapa, Quast sank a Soviet motor torpedo boat of the Black Sea Fleet in the area of Gelendzhik on 20 April 1943. By end-April 1943, credited with 38 aerial victories, Quast had become the fourth highest scoring active fighter pilot of II. Gruppe of JG 52. At the time, the most successful fighter pilots of the Gruppe were Oberleutnant Heinz Schmidt with 130 aerial victories to date, Oberleutnant Barkhorn with 124 claims to date, followed by Leutnant Helmut Haberda with 49 aerial victories. By the end of May, Quast had moved into third place within II. Gruppe, his number of aerial victories had increased to 52 claims. In June, his number of aerial victories had reached 65 claims. For this, Quast was awarded the Honour Goblet of the Luftwaffe on 25 June.

On 7 August, Quast claimed three aerial victories over Yakovlev Yak-1 fighters on an early morning mission in the vicinity southwest of Novorossiysk. During this aerial combat, his Messerschmitt Bf 109 G-6 (Werknummer 15844—factory number) collided with the debris of his third claim. During his captivity, he was awarded the Knight's Cross of the Iron Cross on 31 December 1943 in absentia. The Soviets released him as a prisoner of war in 1949.

Later life and death
On 12 July 1962, Quast was killed in a flying accident when the Aérospatiale Alouette III light utility helicopter, on which he was riding as a passenger, flew into cable near Mittenwald killing all on board. He is listed on the Ehrenmal der Bundeswehr (Bundeswehr Memorial).

Summary of career

Aerial victory claims
According to US historian David T. Zabecki, Quast was credited with 84 aerial victories. Spick also lists Quast with 84 aerial victories claimed in an unknown combat missions. Mathews and Foreman, authors of Luftwaffe Aces — Biographies and Victory Claims, researched the German Federal Archives and found records for 84 aerial victories, all of which claimed on the Eastern Front.

Victory claims were logged to a map-reference (PQ = Planquadrat), for example "PQ 49342". These sectors were then subdivided into 36 smaller units to give a location area 3 × 4 km in size.

Awards
 Iron Cross (1939)
 2nd Class
 1st Class (19 March 1943)
 Honour Goblet of the Luftwaffe on 25 June 1943 as Feldwebel and pilot
 German Cross in Gold on 23 July 1943 as Feldwebel in the 4./Jagdgeschwader 52
 Knight's Cross of the Iron Cross on 31 December 1943 as Fahnenjunker-Oberfeldwebel and pilot in the 4./Jagdgeschwader 52

Notes

References

Citations

Bibliography

 
 
 
 
 
 
 
 
 
 
 
 
 
 
 
 
 
 

1920 births
1962 deaths
People from Harz (district)
Luftwaffe pilots
German World War II flying aces
Recipients of the Gold German Cross
Recipients of the Knight's Cross of the Iron Cross
People from the Province of Saxony
German Air Force personnel
German prisoners of war in World War II held by the Soviet Union
Victims of aviation accidents or incidents in Germany
Aviators killed in aviation accidents or incidents in Germany